Committee of Privileges may refer to:

The Commons Select Committee of Privileges of the House of Commons in the Parliament of the United Kingdom
The Standards and Privileges Committee, predecessor of the above
The Committee for Privileges and Conduct of the House of Lords in the Parliament of the United Kingdom
The United States Senate Committee on Privileges and Elections, a committee of the US Senate, 1871–1947

See also 
 Parliamentary privilege